Ilyich, Ilich or Ilitch is a Russian patronymic meaning "son of Ilya". It most often refers to Vladimir Lenin (Vladimir Ilyich Ulyanov) and multiple places and items named after him. It may refer to 
Ilich (name)
Ilyich-Avia, Ukrainian airline
Ilyich, Kyrgyzstan, a village in Chuy Region, Kyrgyzstan
Ilyich, a former name of Şərur, a city in Azerbaijan
Ilyich, a former name of Sharur Rayon in Azerbaijan
Pyotr Ilyich Tchaikovsky, Russian composer